Håvard Halvorsen (born 20 May 1973) is a Norwegian football defender.

He was born in Trondheim, and joined Byåsen IL from Fauske/Sprint ahead of the 1996 season. He later joined FK Bodø/Glimt, and enjoyed several seasons in the Norwegian Premier League.

References

1973 births
Living people
Norwegian footballers
Byåsen Toppfotball players
FK Bodø/Glimt players
Footballers from Trondheim
Eliteserien players
Norwegian First Division players
Association football defenders